Sāgara is a prominent nāgarāja or dragon king in Mahayana Buddhism. His name comes from the Sanskrit word meaning “ocean.”

Character
Sāgara is listed among the Eight Nāga Kings and is one of sixteen that are spared from the assault of the garudas. His frequent inclusion of Sāgara among the several groups of protective deities in Buddhism is a direct reference to the nāgas and his role as one of their primary leaders. He is listed among the 28 guardians of the thousand-armed Avalokiteśvara.

The Avataṃsaka Sūtra reveals that he is the nāga that presides over the world's supply of rain.

In East Asian art, he is often depicted with a reddish white complexion and assumes a posture of great authority. In his left hand he holds a snake or dragon and in his right hand he wields a sword. He wears a crown that consists of five snakes.

Undersea Palace
Sāgara's palace lays at the bottom of the ocean and is the setting of several Mahayana sutras. It is 84,000 yojanas in length and width with an array of decorations that are seven-fold, including walls, banisters, jeweled nets and seven rows of trees. The palace is adorned with the seven treasures and is filled with the song of innumerable birds.

Literature
King Sāgara appears extensively throughout the Buddhist canon. His name often appears in enumerations of dragon kings that appear among Śākyamuni Buddha's audience. On other occasions, he is a central figure who participates in conversation with the Buddha and bodhisattvas and elucidates matters in the realm of the nāgas.

Lotus Sutra
Chapter 12 of the Lotus Sutra contains the well-known episode of Sāgara's daughter, known simply as nāgakanya ("nāga maiden"), whose transformation allows her to procure the male body of a bodhisattva, followed by becoming a fully enlightened Buddha.

This event was preceded by Mañjuśrī's visit to Sāgara's ocean palace, where he taught the Lotus Sutra to the nāgas.

Lalitavistara Sūtra
Sāgara makes a few appearances in the Lalitavistara Sūtra. He is one among six nāga kings who make the aspiration to venerate the bodhisattva Siddhārtha with clouds and rain of sandalwood powder.

When Siddhārtha discarded the golden bowl provided by Sujātā, Sāgara took it from the bottom of the Nairañjanā River and later gave it to Śakra to be enshrined among the gods in Trāyastriṃśa.

Towards the end of the story, the Buddha is described as having a rumbling voice like that of one of Sāgara's thunderclouds.

Sutra on the Questions of the Nāga King Sāgara
Three extant versions of this sutra exist in both the Tibetan Kangyur and the Taishō Tripiṭaka (T0598, T0599 and T0601). Known in Sanskrit as the Sāgaranāgarājaparipṛcchā Sūtra, all three texts are vastly different from each other regarding their content.

The shortest text opens with the Buddha residing in Sāgara's ocean palace accompanied by an audience of 1,250 monks. The Buddha addresses Sāgara and teaches him that speaking the Four Dharma Seals is synonymous with speaking the 84,000 methods of teaching the Dharma.

See also
Nagaraja
Longnü

References

Buddhist gods
Nāgas
Water gods
Twenty-Four Protective Deities